The Bhuiyan or Bhuiya are an indigenous community found in the Indian states of Bihar, Jharkhand, Madhya Pradesh, Odisha, Uttar Pradesh and West Bengal. They are not only geographically disparate but also have many cultural variations and subgroups.

Etymology
The Bhuiyans name comes from the Sanskrit bhumi, meaning land. Most of the Bhuiya are agriculturalists and many believe that they are descended from Bhūmi, the Hindu goddess who represents Mother Earth. They are patrilineal exogamous groups with strong family ties.

Present circumstances
There are significant economic variations in the Bhuiya community, with some in areas such as Ghatwar and Tikait being landowners  but many others being reliant on working the land either independently or as paid labourers. Basket-making, livestock rearing, fishing, hunting and the sale of forest produce such as firewood, honey and resin also contribute to their livelihood, although the practise of food collection has probably mostly died out. Ghatwar were king during medieval period. They  rebelled against Nagvanshi king Pratap Karn. Nagvanshi suppressed Ghatwar rebellion with the help of king of Kharyagarh Baghdeo Singh. In 1857 rebellion, Tikait Umrao Singh was king of Bandhgawa in Ormanjhi. He participated in rebellion against East India Company in Ranchi.

They have exogamous lineages such as Basuki (cobra), Kachhim (tortoise), Kali (a snake), Sal (a fish), Sigari (fox), Sinjkiri etc in Bihar and Jharkhand. They have titles such as Deshmandal, Ghatowal, Paramanik, Pradhan, Bhogta, Chharidar, Mahto, Rai  Thakur, Tikayat, Bhuiya, Manjhi, Nayak, Roy, Singh in Bihar and Jharkhand.

Official classification
In 1931, during British Period, they were listed as primitive tribe. In 1936 they were listed as Backward tribe. In Patna division, Palamu, Hazaribagh, Manbhum and Bengal, they were included in Scheduled Caste. After independence, the Government of Uttar Pradesh had classified the Bhuiya as a Scheduled Caste but by 2007, they were one of several groups that it redesignated as Scheduled Tribes. As of 2017, this tribal designation applies only for Sonbhadra district. Bhuiya are included in Scheduled Caste in Bihar and Jharkhand. They constitute 21% of total Scheduled Caste population of Jharkhand.  

The 2011 Census of India for Uttar Pradesh showed the Bhuiya Scheduled Caste population as 4095.

See also 
Bhuiyan
Bhuiyar
List of Scheduled Tribes in Uttar Pradesh

References 

Scheduled Tribes of Uttar Pradesh
Scheduled Castes of Uttar Pradesh

Social groups of Assam
Social groups of Bihar
Social groups of Madhya Pradesh
Social groups of Odisha
Social groups of Tamil Nadu